Moura is a small town and locality in the Shire of Banana in Central Queensland, Australia. It services the surrounding coal mining and rural activities.

Economy

A number of industries are represented in the local economy. Chief amongst these is coal mining. The name of the local coal mine changes each time it is sold, currently Dawson Mine, owned and operated by AngloAmerical Coal. Only open-cut mining has been used since 1994. Beef, cotton and cereals are other major industries of the area.

History
In 1854 Charles Marshall named his leased pastoral selection Moura. There are two theories regarding the origin of the name. One is that it is named after Moura in Portugal where he served in the British Army during the Peninsular Wars. The other is that it is an Aboriginal word meaning native camp dog.

The Moura property was developed into a homestead in 1880 by Edward Homer.
The town was first established in 1936 as a farming centre near the existing Moura Station.

The Moura Post Office opened in late 1939.

Moura Provisional School was opened on 10 September 1940. It became Moura State School on 1 January 1948. In 1965 a secondary department was attached to the school. By 1975, there were sufficient secondary students to warrant a formal high school and so Moura State High School was opened on 25 January 1976 with 263 pupils.

Mining disasters

There have been three mining disasters that have occurred near Moura:

The first was the Kianga mining disaster occurring due to an explosion in the underground workings of the Kianga No. 1 mine on 20 September 1975, claiming 13 miners' lives.
The second, on 16 July 1986, was an explosion in the Moura No. 4 underground mine, claiming twelve miners' lives, the youngest miner being 18.
The third was an explosion in the Moura No. 2 underground coal mine on 7 August 1994. Rescue and recovery attempts were abandoned after a second, more violent explosion occurred 18 hours later. Eleven miners' lives had been lost and the mine was sealed at the surface.

After 1994, underground mining ceased and the area was operated as an open-cut coal mine.

In November 2017, a routine blast in the mine resulted in ground movement leading to a "circular geotechnical failure" that resulted in a crack through a public access road across the open pit. The road had been a key access and freight route for farmers and graziers to reach the town of Moura, including a school bus route. The road remained closed in February 2018 and was expected to remain unstable indefinitely. The company had conducted improvements to a southern detour route, and consulted with the community about a viable long-term alternative. A new route was proposed which would cross the pit further north, but was expected to take 15 months to complete construction.

Population

Climate

Average yearly Rainfall: 732mm, raining an average of 63 days per year. The average summer temperature is 32 degrees Celsius (with temperatures in excess of 36 degrees Celsius a common occurrence during Dec-Jan). The average winter temperature is 22 degrees Celsius.

Education 

Moura State School is a government primary school (P-6), while Moura State High School is a government secondary school (7-12). Both are located in Gillespie Street.

Attractions

150th meridian 
The 150th meridian east, located just outside Moura, is popular among tourists as well as local residents to have their picture taken in the exact path of the longitude line. Rocks with drill holes have been lined up to represent the exact angle and location of longitude line.

APEX Park (river) 
The APEX park has free camping grounds with facilities such as hot showers, a traditional wood barbecue, toilets and lawn for the afternoon picnic. It also has a public boat ramp.

Museum 
The Moura Museum and Information Centre is located at 33 Gillespie Street. The museum presents Moura's agricultural and industrial history. A set of Japanese collectables provided by the Mitsui Mining Company are on display.

Culture, Events and Festivals

Muddy Water Classic 
Moura Muddy water classic is a fishing competition held annually on the 3rd weekend in February at the APEX park on the Dawson River. It brings many people from the surrounding areas for the local fishing competition.

Campdrafting
Moura hosts an annual campdraft in July.

Coal and Country Festival 
The Coal and Country festival is held every year in the third week of August for seven days. The festival holds events like coal shovelling and a professional rodeo.

It is often held on the weekend of the third week with festivities beginning on the Friday afternoon and ending on the Sunday. It is held at the recreational grounds where cattle yards and large spaces are easily available

Facilities
The Banana Shire Council has an administrative office in Gillespie Street. It operates a library at MacArthur Street.

The town also has many shops, including banks, post office, video store, grocery store, newsagent, beauticians, hairdressers, butcher, service station, electrical, furniture and hardware store and many more. Moura also has numerous sporting clubs (golf, bowls, squash, football) as well as eateries and restaurants. There is also a RSL and Memorial (now closed) club for socialising.

Town Twinning

 Moura, Portugal

References

External links 

 University of Queensland: Queensland Places: Moura
Mining town casts its memories in Bronze The Australian 19 October 1987
Bronze reminder of a disaster The Sydney Morning Herald 8 April 1988
As Moura mourns the loss of 11 miners, a colleague reveals how he cheated death New Idea, 1994
Moura Chamber of Commerce Community Web Site

Mining towns in Queensland
Towns in Queensland
Shire of Banana
1936 establishments in Australia
Populated places established in 1936
Localities in Queensland